Grihshobha is a biweekly magazine aimed at Indian woman.

History and profile
Grihshobha was started in 1979 as a monthly by the Delhi Press Group. Since its inception, Grihshobha has enjoyed wide readership in the Hindi belt of the country. The headquarters is in New Delhi. The magazine focuses on women's issues, and often features racy short stories, fashion, recipes, advice columns, and comments on socialites and current events. It carries features on housekeeping, cookery, knitting, interior decoration, beauty care, dress designing, hobbies and handicraft, besides helping women understand social, national as well as universal issues.

Although it was started in Hindi language, it has editions in languages Bangla, Gujarati, Kannada, Malayalam, Marathi, Tamil and Telugu. Between July and December 2000 Grihshobha  was the second best-selling women's magazine in India with a circulation of 3,333,651 copies.

References

External links
 Official website

1979 establishments in Delhi
Biweekly magazines published in India
Monthly magazines published in India
Multilingual magazines
Women's magazines published in India
Magazines established in 1979
Magazines published in Delhi